The Wake Forest Demon Deacons baseball team represents Wake Forest University in NCAA Division I college baseball. The program competes in the Atlantic Coast Conference (ACC). They won the 1955 College World Series. They are coached by Tom Walter.

History
The Demon Deacon program began play in 1891.

The Demon Deacons represented the United States in baseball at the 1951 Pan American Games, winning the silver medal. In 1955, the Demon Deacons defeated Western Michigan in the 1955 College World Series, led by coach Taylor Sanford. In 1977, Outfielder Kenny Baker became the first Demon Deacon to win ACC Player of the Year.

The Demon Deacons has been crowned ACC Tournament champions four times: 1977, 1998, 1999, and 2001. In 2010, Tom Walter was hired as Wake Forest's new head coach.

David F. Couch Ballpark
 

On October 31, 2007, Wake Forest University bought Ernie Shore Field for $5.5 million, paying that money upfront. Starting in 2009, home games have been played at Gene Hooks Field at Wake Forest Baseball Park. The Demon Deacons' former home, Gene Hooks Stadium, was demolished following the university's purchase of Ernie Shore Field, which has since been renamed Gene Hooks Field at Wake Forest Baseball Park. In February 2016, the Wake Forest ballpark was renamed David F. Couch Ballpark in honoring former Demon Deacon baseball player David Couch.

Individual awards

ACC Player of the Year 
Kenny Baker (1977)
Brick Smith (1981)
Bill Merrifield (1982, 1983)
Jamie D'Antona (2003)
Will Craig (2015) 
Bobby Seymour (2019)

ACC Coach of the Year 
Marvin Carter (1982)
George Greer (2002)

ACC Rookie of the Year 
Jamie D'Antona (2001) 
Allan Dykstra (2006)

College Baseball Hall of Fame 
In 2010, Charlie Teague became the first and only former Demon Deacon elected into the College Baseball Hall of Fame.

Championships

NCAA College World Series Championships

Conference Champions

Conference Tournament Champions

Current and former major league players

Morrie Aderholt
Gair Allie
Matt Antonelli
Ross Atkins
Junie Barnes
Ryan Braun, pitcher
Mike Buddie
Dave Bush
Tommy Byrne
Rip Coleman
Tim Cooney
Will Craig
Jamie D'Antona
Sean DePaula
Bill Dillman 
Stuart Fairchild
John Gaddy
Chris Getz
Lee Gooch
Tommy Gregg
Erik Hanson
Kevin Jarvis
Tom Lanning
Buddy Lewis
Mike MacDougal
Willard Marshall
Jack Meyer
Doyt Morris
Dick Newsome
Charlie Ripple
Griffin Roberts
Craig Robinson
Ray Scarborough 
Gavin Sheets 
Elmer Sexauer
Brick Smith
Vic Sorrell
Cory Sullivan
Mac Williamson
Larry Woodall
Bill Wynne
Eddie Yount 

Source:

2012 MLB Draft
Six Demon Deacons were selected in the 2012 Major League Baseball draft: OF Mac Williamson by the San Francisco Giants (3rd Round), LHP Tim Cooney by the St. Louis Cardinals (3rd Round), 3B Carlos Lopez by Washington Nationals (12th Round), RHP Brian Holmes by the Houston Astros (13th round), SS Pat Blair by the Houston Astros (24th round), and RHP Michael Dimock also by the Houston Astros.

2016 MLB Draft
Only one Demon Deacon was selected in the 2016 Major League Baseball draft: 3B Will Craig by the Pittsburgh Pirates (1st round;Pick 22).

2017 MLB Draft
In 2017, Eight Wake Forest Demon Deacons were selected in the 2017 Major League Baseball Draft: OF Stuart Fairchild by the Cincinnati Reds (2nd round), 1B Gavin Sheets by the Chicago White Sox (2nd round), RHP Parker Dunshee by the Oakland Athletics (7th round), C Ben Breazeale by the Baltimore Orioles (7th round), RHP Donnie Sellers by the Toronto Blue Jays (11th round), OF Jonathan Pryor by the Washington Nationals (19th round), RHP Connor Johnstone by the Atlanta Braves (21st round), and RHP Griffin Roberts by the Minnesota Twins (29th round) which set a program record and the most in the ACC.

World Series Champions
Only four former Demon Deacons have gone on to win the World Series with their respective teams.

See also
Wake Forest Demon Deacons 
List of NCAA Division I baseball programs

Further reading

References

External links